The Native Location Act of 1879 was an act of racial segregation in South Africa.

References

External links
 1879 Native Locations Act from Nelson Mandela.org

Apartheid laws in South Africa
1879 in South Africa
1879 in law